The 2019 season was Ceres–Negros Football Club's 8th season in existence and the club's 3rd consecutive season in the top flight of Philippine football. In addition to the Philippines Football League, the club competed in the Copa Paulino Alcantara, the AFC Cup, and the first preliminary round of the AFC Champions League. Competitive matches were played from February 5 to November 16, 2019. Ceres–Negros won the Philippines Football League for the third successive season, this time without a single defeat – a record of 22 wins and 2 draws, which included a 17-game winning streak. They also won the Copa Paulino Alcantara unbeaten, completing the domestic double without a single defeat in domestic competitions. The club was less successful in Asian competitions: after losing the first preliminary round of the AFC Champions League, they were transferred to the AFC Cup where they topped their group but were eliminated in the ASEAN Zonal semi-final. Ceres had only 3 losses overall.

Martin Steuble, who was club captain since 2017, left the club in July and was succeeded by Carli de Murga. The main additions to the team were striker Robert Lopez Mendy, and midfielders James Younghusband and Takashi Odawara. Ceres also signed defender Álvaro Silva, who played for the club from February to June.

Ceres–Negros players also won individual awards: Bienvenido Marañón was the 2019 AFC Cup top scorer while Stephan Schröck won the PFL Golden Ball. In the Copa Paulino Alcantara, Robert Lopez Mendy won the Golden Boot while Takashi Odawara won the Golden Ball. Goalkeeper Roland Müller won the Golden Glove in both the PFL and Copa Paulino Alcantara.

In July, the club's future became uncertain when club owner and chairman, Leo Rey Yanson, was ousted as president and CEO of Vallacar Transit by his brother Roy. As the new president, Roy Yanson did not like to invest the company's money into the football club, though Leo Rey insisted that he spends his personal money for the club. On August 11, Leo Rey regained control of the company.

Season overview 
After winning their second consecutive league title in the previous season, Ceres–Negros participated in the qualifiers for the 2019 AFC Champions League. However, before the competitions began, veteran players Patrick Reichelt and Manuel Ott left the club. The notable pre-season signing was Philippines national team defender Álvaro Silva, who previously played under Risto Vidaković at Cádiz. On February 5, Ceres began their campaign by hosting Myanmar National League champions Yangon United for the preliminary round 1, to whom they lost 2–1. As such, they were relegated to the group stage of the AFC Cup, the second-tier competition of Asian club football.

In the AFC Cup, Ceres–Negros were in Group G alongside Vietnamese Cup winners Becamex Bình Dương, Myanmar National League runners-up Shan United, and Indonesian Liga 1 champions Persija Jakarta. Ceres topped their group by winning all but one of their group matches, losing their last match—at home to Becamex Bình Dương 1–0. Their notable group match was the comeback win away to Persija Jakarta on April 23. After a goalless first half, Ceres were down by two goals at the 57th minute until Miguel Tanton and Bienvenido Marañón managed to equalize. Mike Ott then scored the winning goal in injury time, ending the match 3–2.

In the ASEAN Zonal semi-finals, Ceres faced V.League 1 champions Hà Nội who topped Group F. The first leg, played at Panaad on June 18, ended in a 1–1 draw. Ceres went on to lose the second leg in Hanoi on June 25, with a score of 2–1 (3–2 on aggregate), thus failing to make their third consecutive ASEAN Zonal final. Although they were eliminated, Bienvenido Marañón was awarded as AFC Cup top scorer at the end of the season, with 10 goals in eight matches.

In the domestic level, Ceres were supposed to participate in the Philippine Premier League (PPL)—the new top-tier league as the Philippines Football League (PFL) was dissolved after the troubled 2018 season, which Ceres won. However, the PPL was also plagued with numerous issues, with Stallion Laguna and Global Makati withdrawing a day before the season commenced. Ceres later withdrew after the first matchday (in which they were not scheduled to play), and later the Philippine Football Federation (PFF) decided to withdraw its sanction of the PPL thus dissolving the league.

The PFF then decided to revive the PFL for a third season. Ceres' opening PFL fixture was at the Rizal Memorial Stadium against Stallion Laguna on May 25, which ended in a 2–2 draw. On May 29, they earned their first league win of the season at the expense of debutants Philippine Air Force, 5–0. The next day, Kevin Ingreso left the club; he played three and a half years with Ceres. On June 28, notable pre-season signing Álvaro Silva announced his surprise departure. While on July 4, Martin Steuble, who captained Ceres since 2017, left the club to join Port of the Thai League 1. Despite the loss of several key players, Ceres continued to win their matches with Carli de Murga as the new captain. They notably thrashed Philippine Air Force 12–0 on July 13, the league's largest home win of the season.

In the midseason transfer window, Ceres made three notable signings: Senegalese striker Robert Lopez Mendy, who was the PFL's top scorer in 2018 with Kaya–Iloilo, Philippines national team midfielder James Younghusband, and Japanese midfielder Takashi Odawara. On August 28, Ceres thrashed Global Makati 13–0 away, the league's largest margin of victory in the season. On September 28, a 1–1 draw with Stallion Laguna ended Ceres' winning streak at 17 games. After winning the subsequent fixtures, Ceres secured their third consecutive league title by defeating Green Archers United 3–1 on October 12, with two matches to spare. After winning the two remaining games, Ceres completed a historic unbeaten season with a total of 22 wins and 2 draws (68 points). Goalkeeper Roland Müller won the season's Golden Glove while midfielder Stephan Schröck won the Golden Ball. With 30 goals, striker Bienvenido Marañón was the Golden Boot runner-up behind Kaya's Jordan Mintah, who scored 31.

After failing to progress from the group stage in 2018, Ceres were determined to win the 2019 edition of the Copa Paulino Alcantara. They were drawn in Group A alongside Mendiola, Green Archers United, and Philippines U22 (who are participating in preparation for the Southeast Asian Games). In their first group match, they were held to a 2–2 draw by Mendiola. This was followed by wins over the two other clubs as Ceres topped the group. In the semi-finals, they defeated Group B runners-up Stallion Laguna 4–3 to earn their first ever finals appearance. On November 16, Ceres faced defending champions Kaya–Iloilo in the final. Ceres won the match 2–1, completing their domestic double. Ceres won the final despite having only 14 players available in their squad, as the others were either resting or on international duty. Head coach Risto Vidaković was also absent for the final, thus it was assistant coach Jooc Treyes who managed the team. The Copa's individual awards were all won by Ceres players: striker Robert Lopez Mendy, who scored five goals in the tournament, won the Golden Boot, goalkeeper Roland Müller won the Golden Glove, and midfielder Takashi Odawara won the Golden Ball for his defensive performances. With the Copa win, Ceres finished their 2019 season without a single defeat in domestic competitions.

Ownership crisis
On July 7, Ceres–Negros' owner and chairman, Leo Rey Yanson, was ousted as president and CEO of Vallacar Transit in a boardroom coup led by his older brother Roy and supported by three of his other siblings. In a statement, Leo Rey called the move "illegal" and refused to recognize it, saying: "The removal was only done through a special meeting of which the election/removal of the president was not even included in the agenda." As the new president, Roy Yanson accused Leo Rey of using the company's funds for the football team, adding that players who are "just simply kicking the ball" are earning more than the Vallacar Transit employees. Leo Rey defended the football club and denied the accusation, insisting that he funds the team using his own money, saying: "I don't need to justify how much I'm spending for the club because it's my own personal money." Leo Rey also spent for the refurbishment of the Panaad Statium, the club's home ground. Nonetheless, the Yanson siblings' battle for control of the company made the team's future uncertain. The football players expressed their support for Leo Rey, with Stephan Schröck saying: "He's been there for us not only as an owner or manager or benefactor. He was, for the longest time for us, a friend almost like a dad to everyone at the club. We owe him." On August 11, Leo Rey regained control of the company's headquarters in Bacolod with the help of his sister Ginnette, mother Olivia, and the Philippine National Police.

Players

Squad information 
As it stands on November 16, 2019

Transfers 
Note: Flags indicate national team as defined under FIFA eligibility rules. Players may hold more than one non-FIFA nationality.

In

Out

Kits
Supplier: Grand Sport / 
Sponsor: Ceres Liner

Competitions

Overview

Philippines Football League

Standings 

Results summary

Results by round

Matches 

Note:
 a Global forfeited the match due to an inability to field a team. The result was 0-3 in favor of Ceres.

Copa Paulino Alcantara

Group stage 
On October 20, Ceres–Negros were drawn in Group A of the Copa Paulino Alcantara alongside Mendiola, Green Archers United, and Philippines U22.

Knock-out stage

Semi-finals

Final

AFC Champions League

Qualifying play-offs

AFC Cup

Group stage 

The group stage draw was held on November 22, 2018 at the AFC House in Kuala Lumpur, Malaysia. Ceres–Negros were drawn in Group G alongside Vietnamese Cup winners Becamex Bình Dương, Myanmar National League runners-up Shan United, and Indonesian Liga 1 champions Persija Jakarta.

Knockout stage

ASEAN Zonal Semifinal 

Hà Nội won 3–2 on aggregate.

Notes

References

External links 

 

Ceres–Negros F.C. seasons
Ceres-Negros 2019
Ceres-Negros 2019